Jeremiah 32 is the thirty-second chapter of the Book of Jeremiah in the Hebrew Bible or the Old Testament of the Christian Bible. It is numbered as Jeremiah 39 in the Septuagint. This book contains prophecies attributed to the prophet Jeremiah, and is one of the Books of the Prophets. In this chapter, Jeremiah redeems a piece of property belonging to his family and explains the significance of his act.

Text 
The original text of this chapter, as with the rest of the Book of Jeremiah, was written in Hebrew language. Since the division of the Bible into chapters and verses in the late medieval period, this chapter is divided into 44 verses.

Textual witnesses
Some early manuscripts containing the text of this chapter in Hebrew are of the Masoretic Text tradition, which includes the Codex Cairensis (895), the Petersburg Codex of the Prophets (916), Aleppo Codex (10th century), Codex Leningradensis (1008). Some fragments possibly containing parts of this chapter were found among the Dead Sea Scrolls, i.e., 2QJer (2Q13; 1st century CE), with extant verses 24–25.

There is also a translation into Koine Greek known as the Septuagint, made in the last few centuries BCE. Extant ancient manuscripts of the Septuagint version include Codex Vaticanus (B; B; 4th century), Codex Sinaiticus (S; BHK: S; 4th century), Codex Alexandrinus (A; A; 5th century) and Codex Marchalianus (Q; Q; 6th century).

Verse numbering
The order of chapters and verses of the Book of Jeremiah in the English Bibles, Masoretic Text (Hebrew), and Vulgate (Latin), in some places differs from that in Septuagint (LXX, the Greek Bible used in the Eastern Orthodox Church and others) according to Rahlfs or Brenton. The following table is taken with minor adjustments from Brenton's Septuagint, page 971.

The order of Computer Assisted Tools for Septuagint/Scriptural Study (CATSS) based on Alfred Rahlfs' Septuaginta (1935), differs in some details from Joseph Ziegler's critical edition (1957) in Göttingen LXX. Swete's Introduction mostly agrees with Rahlfs' edition (=CATSS).

Parashot
The parashah sections listed here are based on the Aleppo Codex, and those in the missing parts of the codex (since 1947) are from Kimhi's notes, marked with an asterisk (*). Jeremiah 32 is a part of the "Twelfth prophecy (Jeremiah 32-33)" in the "Consolations (Jeremiah 30-33)" section of Prophecies interwoven with narratives about the prophet's life (Jeremiah 26-45). {P}: open parashah; {S}: closed parashah.
 {P} 32:1-5 {P} 32:6-14 {S*} 32:15 {P*} 32:16-25 {S} 32:26-35 {S} 32:36-41 {S} 32:42-44 {P}

Structure
This chapter is structured around the purchase of a family field by Jeremiah. The New King James Version divides this chapter into the following sections:
 = Jeremiah Buys a Field
 = Jeremiah Prays for Understanding
 = God's Assurance of the People's Return

Verse 1
 The word that came to Jeremiah from the Lord in the tenth year of Zedekiah king of Judah, which was the eighteenth year of Nebuchadnezzar.
"The tenth year of Zedekiah king of Judah" was 588 BCE. The 18th year of Nebuchadnezzar's reign is dated from his ascension which was marked by a victory at Carchemish. At this time the siege was ongoing against Jerusalem starting from the 10th month of Zedekiah's 9th year (Jeremiah 39:1) until the city was penetrated 18 months later, in the 4th month of Zedekiah's 11th year (Jeremiah 39:2).

Verse 4
 Yet hear the word of the Lord, O Zedekiah king of Judah! Thus says the Lord concerning you: 'You shall not die by the sword.'

Verse 5
You shall die in peace; as in the ceremonies of your fathers, the former kings who were before you, so they shall burn incense for you and lament for you, saying, "Alas, lord!" For I have pronounced the word, says the Lord.

Verse 12
and I gave the purchase deed to Baruch the son of Neriah, son of Mahseiah, in the presence of Hanamel my uncle's son, and in the presence of the witnesses who signed the purchase deed, before all the Jews who sat in the court of the prison.
"Baruch": for the first time mentioned here as a companion and witness for Jeremiah. His next appearance in the book is in chapter 36. 
Translated as "Ioudaios" in the Septuagint.

Verse 15
For thus saith the Lord of hosts, the God of Israel; Houses and fields and vineyards shall be possessed again in this land.
 "Houses and fields and vineyards": Jeremiah's purchase shows a remarkable faith and confidence of the future restoration of properties in Israel.

Verse 22
 You have given them this land, of which You swore to their fathers to give them—"a land flowing with milk and honey."
 "A land flowing with milk and honey": citing

See also

Anathoth
Baal
Babylon
Baruch the son of Neriah, son of Mahseiah
Benjamin
Chaldea
Egypt
Hanamel the son of Shallum
Israel
Jeremiah
Jerusalem
Judah
Molech
Nebuchadnezzar
Negev
Shfela
Valley of the Son of Hinnom
Zedekiah

Related Bible part: Leviticus 25

Notes

References

Sources

 Ofer, Yosef (1992). "The Aleppo Codex and the Bible of R. Shalom Shachna Yellin" in Rabbi Mordechai Breuer Festschrift: Collected Papers in Jewish Studies, ed. M. Bar-Asher, 1:295-353. Jerusalem (in Hebrew). Online text (PDF)

External links

Jewish
Jeremiah 32 Hebrew with Parallel English

Christian
Jeremiah 32 English Translation with Parallel Latin Vulgate

32